STS-103 was a Hubble Space Telescope servicing mission by Space Shuttle Discovery. The mission launched from Kennedy Space Center, Florida, on 19 December 1999 and returned on 27 December 1999. It was also the last Shuttle mission of the 1990s, and the only mission to span through Christmas.

Crew

Space walks
 Smith and Grunsfeld  – EVA 1
EVA 1 start: 22 December 1999 – 18:54 UTC
EVA 1 end: 23 December 1999 – 03:09 UTC
Duration: 8 hours, 15 minutes
 Foale and Nicollier  – EVA 2
EVA 2 start: 23 December 1999 – 19:06 UTC
EVA 2 end: 24 December 1999 – 03:16 UTC
Duration: 8 hours, 10 minutes
 Smith and Grunsfeld  – EVA 3
EVA 3 start: 24 December 1999 – 19:17 UTC
EVA 3 end: 25 December 1999 – 03:25 UTC
Duration: 8 hours, 08 minutes

Mission highlights

The primary objective of STS-103 was the Hubble Servicing Mission 3A. STS-103 had four scheduled Extravehicular Activity (EVA) days where four crew members worked in pairs on alternating days to renew and refurbish the telescope.

NASA officials decided to move up part of the servicing mission that had been scheduled for June 2000 after three of the telescope's six gyroscopes failed. Three gyroscopes must be working to meet the telescope's very precise pointing requirements, and the telescope's flight rules dictated that NASA consider a "call-up" mission before a fourth gyroscope failed. Four new gyros were installed during the first servicing mission (STS-61) in December 1993 and all six gyros were working during the second servicing mission (STS-82) in February 1997. Since then, a gyro failed in 1997, another in 1998 and a third in 1999. The Hubble team believed they understood the cause of the failures, although they could not be certain until the gyros were returned from space. Having fewer than three working gyroscopes would have precluded science observations, although the telescope would have remained safely in orbit until a servicing crew arrived.

Hubble's gyros spin at a constant rate of 19,200 rpm on gas bearings. This wheel is mounted in a sealed cylinder, which floats in a thick fluid. Electricity is carried to the motor by thin wires (approximately the size of a human hair). It is believed that oxygen in the pressurized air used during the assembly process caused the wires to corrode and break. The new gyros were assembled using nitrogen instead of oxygen. Each gyroscope is packaged in a Rate Sensor assembly. The Rate Sensors are packaged in pairs into an assembly called a Rate Sensor Unit (RSU). It is the RSUs that the STS-103's astronauts changed. The RSUs each weigh  and are 12.8 by 10.5 by 8.9 inches (325 by 267 by 226 mm) in size.

In addition to replacing all six gyroscopes on the December flight, the crew replaced a Fine Guidance Sensor (FGS) and the spacecraft's computer. The new computer reduced the burden of flight software maintenance and significantly lowered costs. The new computer was 20 times faster and had six times the memory of the DF-224 computer previously used on Hubble. It weighs  and is 18.8 by 18 by 13 inches (478 by 457 by 330 mm) in size. The FGS installed was a refurbished unit that was returned from Servicing Mission 2. It weighs  and is 5.5 by 4 by 2 feet (1.68 by 1.22 by 0.61 m) in size.

A voltage/temperature improvement kit (VIK) was also installed to protect spacecraft batteries from overcharging and overheating when the spacecraft goes into safe mode. The VIK modifies the charge cutoff voltage to a lower level to prevent battery overcharging and associated overheating.

The repair mission also installed a new S-Band Single Access Transmitter (SSAT). Hubble has two identical SSATs onboard and can operate with only one. The SSATs send data from Hubble through NASA's Tracking Data Relay Satellite System (TDRSS) to the ground. The new transmitter replaced one that failed in 1998. The SSAT weighs  and is 14 by 8 by  inches (356 by 203 by 70 mm).

A spare solid state recorder was also installed to allow efficient handling of high-volume data. Prior to the second servicing mission, Hubble used three 1970s-style reel-to-reel tape recorders. During the second servicing mission, one of these mechanical recorders was replaced with a digital solid state recorder. During this mission a second mechanical recorder was replaced by a second solid state recorder. The new recorder could hold approximately 10 times as much data as the old unit (12 gigabytes instead of 1.2 gigabytes). The recorder weighs  and is 12 by 9 by 7 inches in size.

Finally, the EVA crew replaced the telescope's outer insulation that had degraded. The insulation is necessary to control the internal temperature on the Hubble. The New Outer Blanket Layer (NOBL) and Shell/Shield Replacement Fabric (SSRF) help protect Hubble from the harsh environment of space. It protects the telescope from the severe and rapid temperature changes it experiences during each 90 minute orbit as it moves from sunlight to darkness.

STS-103 also carried hundreds of thousands of student signatures as part of the Student Signatures in Space (S3) program. The unique project provided elementary schools (selected on a rotating basis) with special posters to be autographed by students, then scanned onto disks and carried aboard a NASA Space Shuttle mission.

It was the Discovery's last solo spaceflight. All later missions by Discovery were International Space Station missions.

Astronaut John Grunsfeld, who was one of the mission specialists on this mission, brought a "Planet Mars Flag" aboard Discovery.

Wake-up calls 
NASA began a tradition of playing music to astronauts during the Gemini program, which was first used to wake up a flight crew during Apollo 15.
Each track is specially chosen, often by their families, and usually has a special meaning to an individual member of the crew, or is applicable to their daily activities.

See also

List of human spaceflights
List of Space Shuttle missions
Outline of space science

References

External links
 NASA mission summary 
 STS-103 Video Highlights 

Spacecraft launched in 1999
Hubble Space Telescope servicing missions
Space Shuttle missions
December 1999 events
1999 in Florida
Spacecraft which reentered in 2009